Dabousieh, or also known as Maarabu-Dabousieh (معربو - الدبوسية), is a Syrian village located in Talkalakh District, Homs.  According to the Syria Central Bureau of Statistics (CBS), Dabousieh had a population of 1,532 in the 2004 census.

References 

Populated places in Homs Governorate